Michael Rubin (born 1971) is an American defense expert. 

Michael Rubin may also refer to:
Michael G. Rubin (born 1972), founder and CEO of GSI, former co-owner of the Philadelphia 76ers
Michael Rubin (composer) (born 1963), American composer